Saul Yanovsky (1864–1939) was an American anarchist and activist. He is best remembered as the editor of the periodicals Freie Arbeiter Stimme (1890–1977), Arbeter Fraynd (1885-1914), Di Abend Tsaytung (1906) and the monthly literary publication Die Fraye Gezelshaft (1910–11). He was a member of the jewish-anarchist group Pioneers of Liberty.

References

Further reading 

 
 

Philosophical anarchists
American anarchists
American Jews
1939 deaths
1864 births
Jewish anarchists
Editors of Fraye Arbeter Shtime